Cathal mac Tadg was King of Connacht, 973.

Cathal only briefly succeeded his brother. Murchadh Glunillar ua Flaithbheartach, King of Aileach, invaded Connacht and gave battle to Cathal at Ceis Corran. Cathal was killed as were some of his prime vassals - "Geibheannach, son of Aedh, lord of Ui-Maine; Tadhg, son of Muircheartach, chief of Ui-Diarmada; Murchadh, son of Flann, son of Glethneachan, chief of Clann-Murchadha; and Seirridh Ua Flaithbheartaigh, with a countless number along with them."

Murchadh totally plundered Connacht afterwards, while Cathal was succeeded as King of Connacht by Cathal mac Conchobar mac Taidg.

References

 Annals of Ulster at CELT: Corpus of Electronic Texts at University College Cork
 Annals of the Four Masters at CELT: Corpus of Electronic Texts at University College Cork
 Annals of Innisfallen at CELT: Corpus of Electronic Texts at University College Cork
 Byrne, Francis John (2001), Irish Kings and High-Kings, Dublin: Four Courts Press, 
 Charles-Edwards, T. M. (2000), Early Christian Ireland, Cambridge: Cambridge University Press,  
Revised edition of McCarthy's synchronisms at Trinity College Dublin.

10th-century births
973 deaths
People from County Roscommon
O'Conor dynasty
10th-century kings of Connacht